Paul Andrew Kirby  (born 27 February 1966) is an Australian politician. He has been the Labor member for Port Darwin in the Northern Territory Legislative Assembly since 2016.

Early life and career
Kirby was the Northern Territory Organiser for the Electrical Trades Union of Australia Queensland and NT Branch before entering politics.

Politics

|}
Kirby was preselected as the Labor candidate for Port Darwin ahead of the 2016 Territory election. The seat's incumbent, John Elferink of the Country Liberal Party, was retiring. Port Darwin had historically been a CLP stronghold, having been in that party's hands for all but two terms of its entire existence. Labor had only won it once, and only on a knife-edge, during its 2005 landslide. Going into the 2016 election, Port Darwin had a notional CLP majority of 9.7 percent after the redistribution, which would have made it a fairly safe CLP seat under normal circumstances.

However, the CLP had been sinking in the polls for some time, particularly in the Darwin area. Additionally, it no longer had the advantage of Elferink's incumbency. On election night, the CLP lost over 19 percent of its primary vote from 2012 amid its near-total meltdown in the capital. This allowed Kirby to take the seat on a swing of 12.5 percent, becoming only the second Labor member ever to win it. He was reelected in 2020, becoming the first Labor MP to win a second term in Port Darwin.

Kirby was appointed to the cabinet after the 2020 election with the portfolios of Small Business, Jobs and Training, Corporate and Digital Development, Public Employment, Veterans Affairs and Recreational Fishing.

References

Living people
Members of the Northern Territory Legislative Assembly
Australian Labor Party members of the Northern Territory Legislative Assembly
21st-century Australian politicians
1966 births
Australian trade unionists